Al-Muhafaza Stadium is a multi-use all-seater stadium in the Syrian capital Damascus. It is mostly used for football matches and is home to the Syrian league club Al-Muhafaza SC. It also hosts local competitions of athletics.

History
The stadium was opened in 2011 with a capacity of 1,000 seats in the Kafr Sousa district of Damascus, with a total cost of US$ 2.8 million. It is owned and operated by the Damascus-based Al-Muhafaza Sports Club and is part of a complex that includes an administration building, gymnasium, theatre, restaurants and plazas.

See also
List of football stadiums in Syria

References

Muhafaza
Muhafaza
Muhafaza
2011 establishments in Syria